Lauren Elizabeth Maltby (born November 17, 1984) is an American actress and psychologist. She is best known for her roles as Margie Hammond in the Zenon trilogy movies and Heather Hartman in Stepsister from Planet Weird.

Maltby was born in San Diego, California. She has an older sister, Jessica.  She is an alumna of Whittier Christian High School where she ran cross country. In the Olympic League cross country finals held on November 2, 2000, she placed 28th with a time of 25:49.15.  She attended Biola University for a Ph.D. in clinical psychology, with her research focusing on ambivalent sexism. Zenon: Z3 was Maltby's final acting project. After the final Zenon movie Lauren Maltby retired from acting. Lauren Maltby is now a psychologist at For The Child in Long Beach and The Cognitive Behavior Therapy Center of Southern California.

Filmography

Television appearances

References

External links

21st-century American psychologists
American women psychologists
20th-century American actresses
21st-century American actresses
American child actresses
American film actresses
Actresses from San Diego
Biola University alumni
1984 births
Living people